Gadirtha pulchra is a moth of the family Nolidae first described by Arthur Gardiner Butler in 1886. It is found from the Indian subregion to the Ryukyu Islands in Japan and Thailand, Singapore, New Guinea and Queensland in Australia.

The wingspan is about 40 mm. Adults are buff and grey, with dark lines on the forewings. The hindwings are white, shading to brown at the margins and with dark veins.

The larvae feed on Sapium and Excoecaria species.

References

Moths described in 1886
Eligminae